Thyca is a genus of small sea snails, marine gastropod mollusks in the family Eulimidae. These snails are ectoparasites of starfish; they are relatively unmodified, the underside having become a suction disc with a central mouth that draws nourishment from the host's tissues.

Description
The conical shell is longitudinally grooved, transparent and slightly curved.

Species 
Species within the genus Thyca include:
 Thyca astericola (A. Adams & Reeve, 1850)
 Thyca callista Berry, 1959
 Thyca crystallina (Gould, 1846)
 Thyca ectoconcha P. Sarasin & F. Sarasin, 1887
 Thyca hawaiiensis Warén, 1980
 Thyca lactea (Kuroda, 1949)
 Thyca nardoafrianti (Habe, 1976)
 Thyca sagamiensis (Kuroda & Habe, 1971)
 Thyca stellasteris Koehler & Vaney, 1912
Species brought into synonymy
 Thyca pellucida Kükenthal, 1897: synonym of Thyca crystallina (Gould, 1846)

References

 Habe T. (1976) Parasitic gastropods from echinoderms of Japan. Bulletin of the National Science Museum [Tokyo], ser. A, 2(3): 157-171. [22 September 1976] page(s): 165
 Warén A. (1980). Revision of the genera Thyca, Stilifer, Scalenostoma, Mucronalia and Echineulima (Mollusca, Prosobranchia, Eulimidae). Zoologica Scripta 9: 187-210
 Warén A. (1984) A generic revision of the family Eulimidae (Gastropoda, Prosobranchia). Journal of Molluscan Studies suppl. 13: 1-96. page(s): 46

Eulimidae